Ust-Kansky District (Ust'-Kanskiy rayon; , Kan-Oozı aymak; , Qan audanı) is an administrative and municipal district (raion), one of the ten in the Altai Republic, Russia. It is located in the west of the republic. Its administrative center is the rural locality (a selo) of Ust-Kan. As of the 2010 Census, the total population of the district was 15,007, with the population of Ust-Kan accounting for 27.5% of that number.

Administrative and municipal status
Within the framework of administrative divisions, Ust-Kansky District is one of the ten in the Altai Republic. As a municipal division, the district is incorporated as Ust-Kansky Municipal District. Both administrative and municipal districts are divided into the same eleven rural settlements, comprising twenty-four rural localities. The selo of Ust-Kan serves as the administrative center of both the administrative and municipal district.

References

Notes

Sources

Districts of the Altai Republic
 
